Xyroscelis is a genus of "jewel beetles" in the subfamily Polycestinae, containing the following species:

 Xyroscelis bumana Williams & Watkins, 1986
 Xyroscelis crocata (Gory & Laporte, 1839)

References

Buprestidae genera